Franz Pitzinger (22 May 1858, Enzersdorf an der Fischa – 10 October 1933, Hofstetten-Grünau) was a naval architect in late-nineteenth- and early twentieth-century Austria-Hungary.

Naval career
He studied mechanical engineering at the Vienna University of Technology and started his career  at Clayton & Shuttleworth.
Pitzinger joined the Austro-Hungarian Navy in 1886. He spent much of his career at the naval arsenal in Pula. He had significant design responsibilities for the Erzherzog Karl-class battleships and the Radetzky-class battleships.
He led the design of the Ersatz Monarch-class battleships which were cancelled when World War I broke out in 1914. In 1914 he was promoted to Naval Constructor General. His naval career ended in 1918 with the collapse of the Austro-Hungarian empire.

References

1858 births
1933 deaths
Austro-Hungarian military personnel of World War I
Austro-Hungarian Navy officers
Austro-Hungarian naval architects
Commanders of the Order of Franz Joseph
People from Bruck an der Leitha District
TU Wien alumni